Yag Tuun Shig (Mongolian: Яг түүн шиг) is a Mongolian talent show based on the Spanish series Your Face Sounds Familiar. The show debuted on 8 May 2016 on Edutainment TV and its first season ended in June 2016.

The second season started on 2 April 2017 on Edutainment TV, and concluded on June 4, 2017. Barkhuu Turbat was announced as the winner of the second season. The show announced its cast for the third season via social media. The third season of Yg Tuun Shig premiered on May 6, 2018, with changes on judging panel. The judge from the first season and the finalist of season two of Yag Tuun Shig, Gankhuu Gendendaram, has returned as a judge for the third season. The previous judges, Onon Nanjid and Naranzun Badar-Uugan, have replaced by season-one runner-up, singer Amarkhuu Borkuu and the show's guest judge from previous two seasons, singer Oyunbileg Khandjav.

Seasons

References

Mongolian television series
Your Face Sounds Familiar
2016 Mongolian television series debuts
Edutainment TV original programming